The Skansen Bridge is a 52-meter span bascule railway bridge located at Skansen in Trondheim, Norway.

History

The bridge was opened on March 22, 1918, allowing trains on the Dovre Line access to  Trondheim Central Station while also being able to open to allow ships on the  Trondheim Canal (Vestre kanalhavn) access to the Trondheimsfjord.

Skansen Bridge was designed by structural engineer Joseph Strauss, who among other things also constructed the Golden Gate Bridge in San Francisco. The Strauss designed single-leaf iron truss railway bridge with overhead counterweight provides clearance for boat traffic. This type of bridge has a counterweight suspended in a parallelogram, as well as motors and gears to lift and lower the end of the bridge.

In 2006,  Skansen Bridge received architectural conservation by the Norwegian Directorate for Cultural Heritage (Riksantikvaren) based upon Skansen Bridge being unique in Norway and only one of a few of its kind left in the world. The conservation includes the entire bridge including construction and technical equipment, the guard cabin and the transformer building. The conservation does not include the railway track, signal equipment or the overhead wires.

Gallery

See also 
 Skansen Station 
 List of bascule bridges

References

Related reading
Koglin, Terry L. (2003)  Movable bridge engineering (John Wiley and Sons)

External links

 Decision to conserve bridge 

Bridges by Joseph Strauss (engineer)
Railway bridges in Trøndelag
Bridges completed in 1918
1918 establishments in Norway
Bascule bridges